Darnhall Mains is a farm and settlement off the A703, near Eddleston and the Eddleston Water in the Scottish Borders area of Scotland, in the former Peeblesshire.

Nearby is a tower house with alternative names: Darnhall, Darn Hall, Black Barony or Barony Castle. It is now the Barony Castle Hotel.

See also
List of places in the Scottish Borders
List of places in Scotland

References
 Callander, J G (1930), Notes on (1) a short cist containing a food-vessel at Darnhall, Peeblesshire, and (2) a cinerary urn from Kirriemuir.
 National Archives of Scotland: Records of the British Railways Board, Plan, elevation & Section of Occupation Bridge at Darnhall Mains Level Scossing, Annotated with Signatures of Twelve Consultees (Peebles Railway)

External links
RCAHMS record of Black Barony; Darn Hall; Darnhall; Black Barony Castle
CANMORE/RCAHMS record of Darnhall Mains, Cist, Food Vessel
Short Cist Containing a Food-vessel at Darnhall
Geograph image: Farm Track, Darnhall Mains
Horseriding in the South of Scotland: Central Tweeddale Routes
Tweed Trails, Peebles and Eddleston

Villages in the Scottish Borders